Channarayapatna Ashwath (29 December 1939 – 29 December 2009) was an Indian music composer and exponent of Bhavageete ("expressive poetry") in the Kannada language. He was also a singer, and sang many of his own compositions. He was credited with singing Bhavageete songs and making sure that they reached the common man.

Early life and education
He was born on December 29, 1939, in Channarayapatna near Devanahalli. He was born into a family rich in traditional and cultural influences. He grew up in the Chamarajpete area of Bangalore. After completing his higher education in Acharaya Pathashala School of NR Colony, he graduated in Science from National College, Basavanagudi and later worked in Indian Telephone Industries for 27 years before retiring as an Executive Engineer in 1992. He started his musical career as a disciple of Devagiri Shankara Joshi in Hindustani music.

Movies
The first film he independently scored music was Kakana Kote. Later followed Chinnari Mutha, Santha Shishunala Sharief, Mysoora Mallige, Kotreshi Kanasu, Nagamandala and few other films in Kannada.

Some of his notable compositions include the composition of music for Mysooru Mallige – a classic work of noted poet K.S. Narasimhaswamy and his compositions of Kannada saint Santa Shishunala Sharifa's works.

L. Vaidyanathan met C. Ashwath during the recording of the film Kakana Kote in 1976. This meeting led them on to a strong relationship of almost three decades. L. Vaidyanathan provided the orchestra for many of Ashwath's compositions, but it was with the film Yene Barali Preeti Irali that the Ashwath-Vaidi duo became collaborators of great music.

Anupama (Olume Poojegende, Bartaale Bartaale, etc.)
Aalemane (Nammoora Mandaara Hoove)
Kaanchana Mruga (ee savidina endendu)
Baadada Hoo (Hoova Nodu Aaaha Entha)
Bhoolokadalli Yamaraaja (Endoo kaanada belaka kande)
Narada Vijaya (Idu entha lokavayya)

Discography

Films

Style 
A pioneer of Kannada "Sugama Sangeetha" (light music), the versatile singer had over 75 albums to his credit.

C. Ashwath is a household name in Karnataka. He is, perhaps the only music director in Karnataka, to have carved a niche of his own in all three fields that demand music as an element of expression: Theatre, Sugama Sangeetha and movies.

Ashwath has also brought out an album titled "Nesara Noodu" which consists of 21 drama songs of his direction.

In the 1990s, Rajkumar had sung Kuvempu's 'Elladaroo Iru Entadaroo Iru' under the music direction of C.Ashwath, which became very popular.

Performance 
The Kannadave Sathya live concert, which was held in Palace Grounds, Bengaluru on 23 April 2005, headed by Ashwath, was the great success which witnessed around a lakh audience for the show. This was the first time a Kannada Musical event was taken place here, while many western and other Indian language programs taken place in the past.

Death
He died on 29 December 2009  on his 70th birthday. He was suffering from renal and liver failures. His friends and well wishers had planned to celebrate his 70th birthday in a spacial way and Swamiji of Suttur Mutt and Virendra Hegde were to facilitate him followed by singing his popular songs.

Awards
1986 - Rajyotsava Award by Governament of Karnataka.

References

External links

 One India

1939 births
2009 deaths
Deaths from liver failure
Deaths from kidney failure
Kannada playback singers
Kannada film score composers
Indian male playback singers
Film musicians from Karnataka
Filmfare Awards South winners
20th-century Indian composers
Bangalore University alumni
Singers from Karnataka
Male film score composers
20th-century Indian male singers
20th-century Indian singers